Tilmen Höyük (also  at Tilmen Hüyük) is an archaeological mound located near the town of Islahiye, in the Gaziantep province of Turkey. It is 225 meters in diameter and 21 meters high on the shores of Karasu River. It is located on the western edge of the Sakçagözü Plain. It is very near the Amanos Mountains.

The settlement on the mound began in the 4th millennium BC. It became a large city at the end of the 3rd millennium BC. The high point of the city was between the 18th and 15th centuries BC.

The city is probably to be identified with the ancient Zalpa (Zalpuwa) mentioned in the Annals of Hattusili I, the capital of Zalpa kingdom. It is also known as Zalbar or Zalwar. The city of Zalpa was formerly equated by scholars with Zalpuwa in Anatolia, located to the north of Ḫattuša near the Black Sea.

Excavations history 

The mound rises 20 meters above the vast marshes of Karasu River. The river flows on the eastern and northern edges of town.

The excavations were started in 1959 by Dr. Bahadır Alkım and continued until 1964. Also in 1959, excavations were conducted in Gedikli Karahöyük, a nearby settlement. Excavations were also carried out in 1969-1972.

The recent excavations were started in 2005 by a joint Turkish-Italian team with N. Marchetti from La Sapienza University of Rome, Bologna University, and Dr. Refik Duru.

Work is ongoing to create an archaeological park. This is a very rich ancient cultural area with over fifty mounds identified on the surrounding plain.

Stratification 
 Late Chalcolithic Age (3,400 - 3,000 BC)
 Early Bronze Age (3rd millennium BC)
 Middle Bronze Age (2,000 - 1,500 BC)
 Primarily Middle Bronze II (1,800 - 1,600 BC)
 Iron Age (1st millennium BC)
 Roman - Byzantine Period
 Islamic Period

Around the 1620s, the Hittite Great King Ḫattušili I led a military campaign into the Amuq plain and against Aleppo, Tilmen Höyük was destroyed in a major fire.

Excavations results 
The finds indicate that Tilmen Höyük was an important link in the cultural contacts between Northern Mesopotamia and Anatolia.

The double casemate walls of city the were made of large stones without mortar, and date from the end of the 2nd millennium BC to the beginning of the 1st millennium BC.

Two basalt gate lions were found next to the monumental gate on the east side of the city, which was the main entrance gate. There are two smaller gates, one in the northwest and the other in the southwest. Rectangular defence towers around the perimeter were also constructed, and there was a casemate fortification system.

The buildings were made of basalt, which is abundant in the area; adobe construction was used only on the upper part of the walls.

One of the monumental structures unearthed is very similar to the palace in Alalah in Amik Plain (7th stratum). Alalah was part of the kingdom of Yamhad, an Amorite kingdom centered mainly in Aleppo. Tilmen was one of the 20 kingdoms of Yamhad.

Tilmen stela 
An Old Syrian stela was discovered in Tilmen in 2004. It was found in the western lower town, in a monumental in antis temple and its temenos in Area M. The stela measures 67 cm in height, and 53 cm in width. It portrays a standing god with his cap with two opposite horns, and an important local official.

According to the archaeologist Nicolò Marchetti,

"This sculpture is the most ancient piece thus far retrieved in Gaziantep area and it is one of the few provenanced Old Syrian sculptures found outside of Ebla. This find also supplies an important piece of evidence for setting the scope of the activities of high-ranking personages within Old Syrian society: that a dignitary at the very end of the MBA represented himself on a stela dedicated to a deity in its temple seems significant if one compares this pattern with that of Old Babylonian Mesopotamia."

Clay bulla 
Also an interesting classic Old Syrian Bulla (seal) was found the palace area in earlier excavations in 1962. The 'Old Syrian period' is generally defined as the time of the rise and predominance of Yamkhad in upper Syria.

The clay bulla was found at the mound, and it is believed to be from the first half of the 2nd millennium BC. This find suggests the existence of a Babylonian trading station at Tilmen going back to the early Old Babylonian period.

See also
 Cities of the ancient Near East
 Titris Hoyuk
 Coba Höyük
 Samʼal

Notes

Bibliography
 R. Duru, Excavations at Tilmen Höyük I. Tilmen Höyük Kazıları I, Türk Tarih Kurumu, Ankara 2013.
Marchetti, N. (2008). A preliminary report on the 2003 and 2004 excavations at Tilmen Höyük. In Proceedings of the 4th International Congress of the Archaeology of the Ancient Near East (Vol. 2, pp. 353-360)
 Marchetti, N. (2008). A preliminary report on the 2005 and 2006 excavations at Tilmen Höyük. In Proceedings of the 5th International Congress on the Archaeology of the Ancient Near East, Madrid April 3-8 2006: Actas del V Congreso Internacional de Arqueología del Oriente Próximo Antiguo (pp. 465-479). Universidad Autónoma de Madrid
 Marchetti, N., Matthiae, P., Pinnock, F., Nigro, L., & Marchetti, N. (2010). A preliminary report on the 2007 and 2008 excavations and restorations at Tilmen Höyük. In Proceedings of the 6th International Congress on the Archaeology of the Ancient Near East (pp. 369-383)
 Marchesi, G., & Marchetti, N. (2019). A babylonian official at Tilmen Höyük in the time of king Sumu-la-el of Babylon (Tab. I-XII). Orientalia, 88(1), 1-36
 Nicolò Marchetti: La cittadella regale di Tilmen Höyük. Palazzi, templi e fortezze del II millennio a.C. in un'antica capitale dell'Anatolia sud-orientale (Turchia) In: Maria Teresa Guaitoli u. a. (Hrsg.): Scoprire. Scavi del Dipartimento di Archeologia. Bologna, Ante Quem 2004, ISBN 88-900972-6-4, S. 191–196.
 Nicolò Marchetti: Middle Bronze Age Public Architecture at Tilmen Höyük and the Architectural Tradition of Old Syrien Palaces. In: Ina Kibrāt Erbetti. Studi di archeologia orientale dedicati a Paolo Matthiae. Rom, Università La Sapienza 2006, ISBN 88-87242-73-9, S. 275–308.
 Nicolò Marchetti: The 2005 joint turkish-italian excavations at Tilmen Höyük. In: 28. Kazi Sonuçları Toplantısı Bd. 2. Ankara, Kültür ve Turizm Bakanlığı 2007, ISBN 978-975-17-3244-6, S. 355–364.

External links
 The Tilmen Project orientlab.net
 New Results on Middle Bronze Age Urbanism in South-Eastern Anatolia: The 2004 Campaign at Tilmen Höyük - Nicolò Marchetti - Colloquium Anatolicum V 2006 pp. 199-211

Archaeological sites in Southeastern Anatolia
Former populated places in Turkey
History of Gaziantep Province